The 1990–91 NBA season was the Rockets' 24th season in the National Basketball Association, and 20th season in the city of Houston. In the off-season, the Rockets acquired Kenny Smith from the Atlanta Hawks. The Rockets continued to play .500 basketball during the first half of the season, as Hakeem Olajuwon missed 25 games due to a bone fracture in his right eye. However, the Rockets showed improvement by holding a 27–21 record at the All-Star break, posting a 14–1 record in March, which included a 13-game winning streak. They finished third in the Midwest Division with a 52–30 record.

Olajuwon averaged 21.2 points, 13.8 rebounds and 3.9 blocks per game in 56 games, and was named to the All-NBA Third Team and NBA All-Defensive Second Team, but was not selected for the All-Star Game. Smith provided a spark averaging 17.7 points and 7.1 assists per game, while Otis Thorpe averaged 17.5 points and 10.3 rebounds per game, and Vernon Maxwell contributed 17.0 points per game and led the league with 172 three-point field goals. Buck Johnson provided the team with 13.6 points per game, and Sleepy Floyd played a sixth man role, averaging 12.3 points and 3.9 assists per game off the bench. Head coach Don Chaney was named Coach of the Year, and Smith finished in third place in Most Improved Player voting.

However, in the Western Conference First Round of the playoffs, the Rockets were swept by the Los Angeles Lakers in three straight games, marking the second consecutive season the Rockets had their season ended by the Lakers. The Lakers would lose in five games to the Chicago Bulls in the NBA Finals.

Draft picks

Roster

Regular season

Season standings

y – clinched division title
x – clinched playoff spot

z – clinched division title
y – clinched division title
x – clinched playoff spot

Record vs. opponents

Game log

Regular season

|- align="center" bgcolor="#ffcccc"
| 1
| November 2
| @ Portland
| L 89–90
|
|
|
| Memorial Coliseum
| 0–1
|- align="center" bgcolor="#ffcccc"
| 2
| November 3
| @ Seattle
| L 106–108
|
|
|
| Seattle Center Coliseum
| 0–2
|- align="center" bgcolor="#ccffcc"
| 3
| November 6
| Denver
| W 145–135
|
|
|
| The Summit
| 1–2
|- align="center" bgcolor="#ccffcc"
| 4
| November 8
| Orlando
| W 103–99
|
|
|
| The Summit
| 2–2
|- align="center" bgcolor="#ffcccc"
| 5
| November 10
| @ San Antonio
| L 110–111
|
|
|
| HemisFair Arena
| 2–3
|- align="center" bgcolor="#ccffcc"
| 6
| November 11
| Utah
| W 110–90
|
|
|
| The Summit
| 3–3
|- align="center" bgcolor="#ccffcc"
| 7
| November 13
| Minnesota
| W 90–88
|
|
|
| The Summit
| 4–3
|- align="center" bgcolor="#ffcccc"
| 8
| November 15
| L.A. Lakers
| L 103–108 (OT)
|
|
|
| The Summit
| 4–4
|- align="center" bgcolor="#ccffcc"
| 9
| November 17
| Miami
| W 117–100
|
|
|
| The Summit
| 5–4
|- align="center" bgcolor="#ccffcc"
| 10
| November 20
| @ New York
| W 115–88
|
|
|
| Madison Square Garden
| 6–4
|- align="center" bgcolor="#ffcccc"
| 11
| November 21
| @ Boston
| L 95–108
|
|
|
| Boston Garden
| 6–5
|- align="center" bgcolor="#ffcccc"
| 12
| November 23
| @ Indiana
| L 111–112
|
|
|
| Market Square Arena
| 6–6
|- align="center" bgcolor="#ccffcc"
| 13
| November 25
| @ Minnesota
| W 107–91
|
|
|
| Target Center
| 7–6
|- align="center" bgcolor="#ccffcc"
| 14
| November 27
| L.A. Clippers
| W 107–102
|
|
|
| The Summit
| 8–6
|- align="center" bgcolor="#ffcccc"
| 15
| November 28
| @ Utah
| L 92–103
|
|
|
| Salt Palace
| 8–7

|- align="center" bgcolor="#ccffcc"
| 16
| December 1
| Sacramento
| W 117–93
|
|
|
| The Summit
| 9–7
|- align="center" bgcolor="#ffcccc"
| 17
| December 4
| Atlanta
| L 110–113
|
|
|
| The Summit
| 9–8
|- align="center" bgcolor="#ccffcc"
| 18
| December 6
| Charlotte
| W 116–110
|
|
|
| The Summit
| 10–8
|- align="center" bgcolor="#ccffcc"
| 19
| December 8
| @ Dallas
| W 113–107
|
|
|
| Reunion Arena
| 11–8
|- align="center" bgcolor="#ffcccc"
| 20
| December 10
| Boston
| L 95–107
|
|
|
| The Summit
| 11–9
|- align="center" bgcolor="#ccffcc"
| 21
| December 12
| @ Philadelphia
| W 108–100
|
|
|
| The Spectrum
| 12–9
|- align="center" bgcolor="#ffcccc"
| 22
| December 14
| @ Washington
| L 93–106
|
|
|
| Capital Centre
| 12–10
|- align="center" bgcolor="#ccffcc"
| 23
| December 15
| @ Charlotte
| W 100–97
|
|
|
| Charlotte Coliseum
| 13–10
|- align="center" bgcolor="#ffcccc"
| 24
| December 18
| San Antonio
| L 95–96
|
|
|
| The Summit
| 13–11
|- align="center" bgcolor="#ccffcc"
| 25
| December 20
| Orlando
| W 128–126 (OT)
|
|
|
| The Summit
| 14–11
|- align="center" bgcolor="#ccffcc"
| 26
| December 22
| Phoenix
| W 122–102
|
|
|
| The Summit
| 15–11
|- align="center" bgcolor="#ffcccc"
| 27
| December 26
| @ Orlando
| L 103–109
|
|
|
| Orlando Arena
| 15–12
|- align="center" bgcolor="#ccffcc"
| 28
| December 28
| @ New Jersey
| W 101–99
|
|
|
| Brendan Byrne Arena
| 16–12
|- align="center" bgcolor="#ffcccc"
| 29
| December 29
| @ Detroit
| L 84–99
|
|
|
| The Palace of Auburn Hills
| 16–13

|- align="center" bgcolor="#ccffcc"
| 30
| January 3
| Chicago
| W 114–92
|
|
|
| The Summit
| 17–13
|- align="center" bgcolor="#ccffcc"
| 31
| January 5
| Indiana
| W 112–99
|
|
|
| The Summit
| 18–13
|- align="center" bgcolor="#ffcccc"
| 32
| January 8
| Portland
| L 97–123
|
|
|
| The Summit
| 18–14
|- align="center" bgcolor="#ccffcc"
| 33
| January 10
| @ Denver
| W 156–133
|
|
|
| McNichols Sports Arena
| 19–14
|- align="center" bgcolor="#ffcccc"
| 34
| January 11
| @ Phoenix
| L 110–114
|
|
|
| Arizona Veterans Memorial Coliseum
| 19–15
|- align="center" bgcolor="#ffcccc"
| 35
| January 13
| @ L.A. Lakers
| L 97–116
|
|
|
| Great Western Forum
| 19–16
|- align="center" bgcolor="#ffcccc"
| 36
| January 14
| @ L.A. Clippers
| L 126–130 (OT)
|
|
|
| Los Angeles Memorial Sports Arena
| 19–17
|- align="center" bgcolor="#ffcccc"
| 37
| January 17
| Detroit
| L 91–97 (OT)
|
|
|
| The Summit
| 19–18
|- align="center" bgcolor="#ccffcc"
| 38
| January 19
| L.A. Clippers
| W 107–96
|
|
|
| The Summit
| 20–18
|- align="center" bgcolor="#ffcccc"
| 39
| January 21
| @ Sacramento
| L 94–97
|
|
|
| ARCO Arena
| 20–19
|- align="center" bgcolor="#ffcccc"
| 40
| January 22
| @ Golden State
| L 116–123
|
|
|
| Oakland–Alameda County Coliseum Arena
| 20–20
|- align="center" bgcolor="#ccffcc"
| 41
| January 24
| Minnesota
| W 118–94
|
|
|
| The Summit
| 21–20
|- align="center" bgcolor="#ccffcc"
| 42
| January 26
| Cleveland
| W 103–97
|
|
|
| The Summit
| 22–20
|- align="center" bgcolor="#ccffcc"
| 43
| January 29
| San Antonio
| W 91–89
|
|
|
| The Summit
| 23–20
|- align="center" bgcolor="#ffcccc"
| 44
| January 31
| Seattle
| L 94–97
|
|
|
| The Summit
| 23–21

|- align="center" bgcolor="#ccffcc"
| 45
| February 2
| @ San Antonio
| W 100–94 (OT)
|
|
|
| HemisFair Arena
| 24–21
|- align="center" bgcolor="#ccffcc"
| 46
| February 3
| Golden State
| W 143–135 (2OT)
|
|
|
| The Summit
| 25–21
|- align="center" bgcolor="#ccffcc"
| 47
| February 6
| @ Milwaukee
| W 111–109
|
|
|
| Bradley Center
| 26–21
|- align="center" bgcolor="#ccffcc"
| 48
| February 7
| @ Cleveland
| W 96–92
|
|
|
| Richfield Coliseum
| 27–21
|- align="center" bgcolor="#ffcccc"
| 49
| February 12
| @ Utah
| L 92–113
|
|
|
| Salt Palace
| 27–22
|- align="center" bgcolor="#ccffcc"
| 50
| February 14
| Washington
| W 129–117
|
|
|
| The Summit
| 28–22
|- align="center" bgcolor="#ccffcc"
| 51
| February 16
| Phoenix
| W 100–91
|
|
|
| The Summit
| 29–22
|- align="center" bgcolor="#ffcccc"
| 52
| February 19
| L.A. Lakers
| L 103–112
|
|
|
| The Summit
| 29–23
|- align="center" bgcolor="#ccffcc"
| 53
| February 21
| Milwaukee
| W 92–90
|
|
|
| The Summit
| 30–23
|- align="center" bgcolor="#ccffcc"
| 54
| February 24
| @ Minnesota
| W 100–91
|
|
|
| Target Center
| 30–24
|- align="center" bgcolor="#ccffcc"
| 55
| February 26
| @ Denver
| W 129–99
|
|
|
| McNichols Sports Arena
| 32–23
|- align="center" bgcolor="#ffcccc"
| 56
| February 28
| @ L.A. Clippers
| L 80–83
|
|
|
| Los Angeles Memorial Sports Arena
| 32–24

|- align="center" bgcolor="#ccffcc"
| 57
| March 3
| @ L.A. Lakers
| W 104–95
|
|
|
| Great Western Forum
| 33–24
|- align="center" bgcolor="#ccffcc"
| 58
| March 5
| New Jersey
| W 112–100
|
|
|
| The Summit
| 34–24
|- align="center" bgcolor="#ccffcc"
| 59
| March 7
| Dallas
| W 122–90
|
|
|
| The Summit
| 35–24
|- align="center" bgcolor="#ccffcc"
| 60
| March 9
| Philadelphia
| W 97–80
|
|
|
| The Summit
| 36–24
|- align="center" bgcolor="#ccffcc"
| 61
| March 12
| Seattle
| W 93–91
|
|
|
| The Summit
| 37–24
|- align="center" bgcolor="#ccffcc"
| 62
| March 14
| Orlando
| W 119–95
|
|
|
| The Summit
| 38–24
|- align="center" bgcolor="#ccffcc"
| 63
| March 15
| @ Phoenix
| W 135–128
|
|
|
| Arizona Veterans Memorial Coliseum
| 39–24
|- align="center" bgcolor="#ccffcc"
| 64
| March 17
| Golden State
| W 123–119
|
|
|
| The Summit
| 40–24
|- align="center" bgcolor="#ccffcc"
| 65
| March 19
| @ Minnesota
| W 98–85
|
|
|
| Target Center
| 41–24
|- align="center" bgcolor="#ccffcc"
| 66
| March 21
| Sacramento
| W 98–87
|
|
|
| The Summit
| 42–24
|- align="center" bgcolor="#ccffcc"
| 67
| March 23
| New York
| W 111–98
|
|
|
| The Summit
| 43–24
|- align="center" bgcolor="#ccffcc"
| 68
| March 25
| @ Chicago
| W 100–90
|
|
|
| Chicago Stadium
| 44–24
|- align="center" bgcolor="#ccffcc"
| 69
| March 28
| @ Atlanta
| W 112–111
|
|
|
| The Omni
| 45–24
|- align="center" bgcolor="#ffcccc"
| 70
| March 30
| @ Orlando
| L 82–114
|
|
|
| Orlando Arena
| 45–25
|- align="center" bgcolor="#ccffcc"
| 71
| March 31
| @ Miami
| W 123–103
|
|
|
| Miami Arena
| 46–25

|- align="center" bgcolor="#ccffcc"
| 72
| April 3
| Dallas
| W 102–86
|
|
|
| The Summit
| 47–25
|- align="center" bgcolor="#ccffcc"
| 73
| April 5
| @ Denver
| W 126–120
|
|
|
| McNichols Sports Arena
| 48–25
|- align="center" bgcolor="#ccffcc"
| 74
| April 6
| Utah
| W 97–88
|
|
|
| The Summit
| 49–25
|- align="center" bgcolor="#ffcccc"
| 75
| April 9
| Portland
| L 93–103
|
|
|
| The Summit
| 49–26
|- align="center" bgcolor="#ffcccc"
| 76
| April 11
| @ Golden State
| L 99–111
|
|
|
| Oakland–Alameda County Coliseum Arena
| 49–27
|- align="center" bgcolor="#ccffcc"
| 77
| April 13
| @ Sacramento
| W 95–94
|
|
|
| ARCO Arena
| 50–27
|- align="center" bgcolor="#ccffcc"
| 78
| April 15
| @ Seattle
| W 97–93
|
|
|
| Seattle Center Coliseum
| 51–27
|- align="center" bgcolor="#ffcccc"
| 79
| April 16
| @ Portland
| L 96–115
|
|
|
| Memorial Coliseum
| 51–28
|- align="center" bgcolor="#ffcccc"
| 80
| April 18
| San Antonio
| L 95–102
|
|
|
| The Summit
| 51–29
|- align="center" bgcolor="#ffcccc"
| 81
| April 19
| @ Dallas
| L 107–113
|
|
|
| Reunion Arena
| 51–30
|- align="center" bgcolor="#ccffcc"
| 82
| April 21
| Denver
| W 131–125
|
|
|
| The Summit
| 52–30

Playoffs

|- align="center" bgcolor="#ffcccc"
| 1
| April 25
| @ L.A. Lakers
| L 92–94
| Hakeem Olajuwon (22)
| Hakeem Olajuwon (16)
| Maxwell, K. Smith (5)
| Great Western Forum17,505
| 0–1
|- align="center" bgcolor="#ffcccc"
| 2
| April 27
| @ L.A. Lakers
| L 98–109
| Vernon Maxwell (31)
| Hakeem Olajuwon (11)
| Kenny Smith (7)
| Great Western Forum17,505
| 0–2
|- align="center" bgcolor="#ffcccc"
| 3
| April 30
| L.A. Lakers
| L 90–94
| Thorpe, Olajuwon (21)
| Hakeem Olajuwon (17)
| Kenny Smith (12)
| The Summit16,611
| 0–3
|-

Player statistics

NOTE: Please write the players statistics in alphabetical order by last name.

Season

Playoffs

Awards and records
 Don Chaney, NBA Coach of the Year Award
 Hakeem Olajuwon, All-NBA Third Team
 Hakeem Olajuwon, NBA All-Defensive Second Team

Transactions

References

See also
1990–91 NBA season

Houston Rockets seasons